Marcelle Tiard (June 18, 1861 - June 1, 1932) was a French Esperantist.

Biography
Marcelle Tiard was born on June 18, 1861 in Paris.

She learned Esperanto in 1903, before teaching it to the blind. She is known to the  under the number 11420. Tiard presided over the Esperanto group of Nice and the Federation of Provence. She founded and presided over the Esperantist group of Algiers. She was president of this union for some time and provided moral and financial support.

Marcelle Tiard died in Neuilly-sur-Seine, June 1, 1932.

See also
 List of Esperanto speakers

References

1861 births
1932 deaths
People from Paris
French Esperantists
Women founders
Esperanto educators